The Belgian Prix de Rome is an award for young artists, created in 1832, following the example of the original French Prix de Rome. The Royal Academy of Fine Arts Antwerp organised the prize until 1920, when the national government took over. The first prize is also sometimes called the Grand Prix de Rome. There were distinct categories for painting, sculpture, architecture and music.

History
The Prix de Rome was a scholarship for arts students. It was created in 1663 in France under the reign of Louis XIV. It was an annual burse for promising artists (painters, sculptors, and architects) who proved their talents by completing a very difficult elimination contest. The prize, organised by the Royal Academy of Painting and Sculpture (Académie royale de peinture et de sculpture), was open to their students. The award winner would win a stay at the Palazzo Mancini in Rome at the expense of the King of France. The stay could be extended if the director of the institution deemed it desirable.

Expanded after 140 years into five categories, the contest started in 1663 as three categories – painting, sculpting, and architecture; in 1803, music was added; in 1804, engraving was added. The winner of the "First Grand Prize" (called the agréé) would be sent to The Academy of France in Rome founded by Jean-Baptiste Colbert in 1666. In 1807, Louis Napoleon created the Dutch version of the Prix de Rome. After the creation of Belgium as an independent state in 1830, the Belgian government started their own version of the Prix de Rome in 1832.

Winners

1832: Antoine Wiertz, painting
1838: Robert-Julien Van Maldeghem, music
1842: Jean Portaels, painting
1843: Victor Lagye, painting
1845: Adolphe Samuel, music
1846: Jozef Geefs, sculpture
1847: François-Auguste Gevaert, music
1847: Joseph Stallaert, painting
1848: Joseph Bal, engraving
1849: Chrétien-Joseph-François-Alex Stadtfeldt, music
1850: Louis Delbeke, painting
1851: Eduard Lassen, music
1852: Ferdinand Pauwels, painting
1853: Luigi Agnesi, music
1855: Pierre Demol, music
1855: Gustave-Joseph Biot, painting
1857: Peter Benoit, music
1857: Polydore Beaufaux, painting
1858: Jean-Louis Baeckelmans, architecture
1859: Jean-Théodore Radoux, music
1862: Louis Delacenserie, architecture
1863: Henri-Joseph Dupont, music
1864: Jan Frans Deckers, sculpture
1865: Léon-Gustave Huberti, music
1866: Joseph Naert, architecture
1867: Edgar Tinel, music
1869: Jean-Baptiste Vanden Eeden, music
?: Henri Van Dievoet, architecture
1870: Xavier Mellery, painting
1871: Ernest Dieltiens, architecture
1871: Guillaume Demol, music
1875: Isodore-Séraphin De Vos, music
1877: Julien Dillens, sculpture
1877: Julien-Jean Simar, music
1879: Rémy Cogghe, painting
1881: Sylvain Dupuis, music
1882: Guillaume Charlier, sculpture
1884: Eugeen Dieltiens, architecture
1885: Léon Dubois, music
1885: Julius Anthone, sculpture
1886: Constant Montald, painting
1887: Pierre Heckers, music
1887: Charles De Wulf, architecture
1889: Paul Gilson, music
1891: Paul-Henri-Joseph Lebrun, music

1893: Lodewijk Mortelmans, music
1895: Jean Delville, painting
1895: Martin Lunssens, music
1897: Joseph Jongen, music
1899: François Rasse, music
1901: Adolphe Biarent, music
1902: Triphon De Smet, architecture
1909: Robert Herberigs, music
1909: Marcel Rau, sculpture
1911: Michel Brusselmans, music
1911: Louis Buisseret, graphics
1913: Léon Jongen, music
1920: Max Van Dyck, painting
1920: René Barbier, music 
1921: Fernand Quinet, music
1922: Marie Howet, painting 
1924: Edgard Steurbaut, architecture
1927: Jeanne Louise Milde, sculpture
1932: Jean Boedts, engraving
1932: Willy Kreitz, sculpture
1933: Jozef-Louis Stynen, architecture
1933: Prosper Van Eechaute, music
1935: Alphonse Darville, sculpture
 1935 - Cantata  Le Vieux Soudard, Léon Simar (1909-1983) second prize (music)
1936: Victor Blommaert, architecture
1937: Jan Cobbaert, painting
 1937 - Cantata Le Trapèze Étoilé, Léon Simar (1909-1983) first prize (music)
1939: Leo De Budt, painting 
1940: Gustave Camus, painting
1941: Maurits De Vocht, architecture
1943: Henri Brasseur, painting
1943: Jean Louel, music 
1944: Albert Baisieux, sculpture
1944: Lode Eyckermans, sculpture
1945: Marcel Quinet, music 
1946: Jos De Maegd, painting 
1950: Paul Ausloos, painting
1953: Joseph Braun, sculpture
1956: Olivier Strebelle, sculpture
1959: Jacqueline Fontyn, music
1961: Alfons Van Meirvenne, sculpture
1961: Jacques Leduc, music 
1965: Frederik Van Rossum, music 
1967: Paul Schellekens, architecture
1969: Johan Baele, architecture
1974: Serge Gangolf, sculpture

Second prizes
1846: Joseph-Jacques Ducaju, sculpture
1847: Jacques-Nicolas Lemmens, music
1851: Jan Andries Laumans, sculpture
1857: Joseph Conradi, music
1865: Gustave-Jean-Constant-Marie Van Hoey, music
1869: Emile-Louis-Victor Mathieu, music
1869: Félix Pardon, music
1875: Alfred Tilman, music
1889: Victor Van Dyck, painting (third prize - Max Van Dyck's father, winner 1920)
1891: Guillaume Lekeu, music
1891: Charles-Antoine Smulders, music
1893: Joseph Vander Meulen, music
1895: Nicolas Daneau, music
1899: Léon Henry, music
1899: Albert Dupuis, music
1904: Joe English, painting
1907: Joe English, painting
1909: Geo Verbanck, sculpture
1913: Alphonse Decuyper, second prize
1919: René Barbier, music
1922: Jean Absil, music
1923: Auguste Mambour, painting
1925: Lode De Maeyer, painting
1930: Jacques Maes, painting
1943: Vic Legley, music 
1947: André Willequet, sculpture
1952: Bérénice Devos, painting

See also

 List of European art awards

References

Visual arts awards
Arts awards
Architecture awards
Belgian awards
1832 establishments in Belgium
Education in Rome
Culture in Rome
 
Awards established in 1832